The 52nd Aviation Regiment is an aviation regiment of the U.S. Army.

History

During 1966 the 52nd Combat Aviation Battalion, 1st Aviation Group included:
 Command and Control Group, Headquarters and Headquarters Detachment
 155th Aviation Company
 161st Aviation Company
 170th Aviation Company
 Detachment, 219th Aviation Company
 Detachment, 498th Medical Company (Air Ambulance)
 Detachment, Company C, 228th Aviation Battalion
 Helicopters from the 1st Cavalry Division
 119th Assault Helicopter Company

In 1968 the 52nd Combat Aviation Battalion was commanded by LTC. Chamberlain.

In 1969 The 52nd Combat Aviation Battalion was commanded by LTC. Patrick John O'Grady.

Lineage
Constituted 31 May 1940 in the Regular Army as Headquarters and Headquarters Detachment, 204th Quartermaster Battalion

Activated 10 June 1942 at Compton, California

Redesignated 1 July 1942 as Headquarters and Headquarters Detachment, 204th Quartermaster Gas Supply Battalion

Reorganized and redesignated 10 December 1943 as Headquarters and Headquarters Detachment, 204th Quartermaster Battalion, Mobile

Inactivated 13 October 1945 at Camp Kilmer, New Jersey

Converted and redesignated 1 August 1946 as Headquarters and Headquarters Detachment, 204th Transportation Corps Truck Battalion; concurrently activated at Fort Benning, Georgia

Redesignated 20 May 1947 as Headquarters and Headquarters Detachment, 204th Transportation Truck Battalion

Reorganized and redesignated 16 May 1949 as Headquarters and Headquarters Company, 52d Transportation Truck Battalion

Reorganized and redesignated 1 April 1954 as Headquarters and Headquarters Company, 52d Transportation Battalion

Inactivated 10 May 1955 in Japan

Redesignated 13 October 1955 as Headquarters and Headquarters Detachment, 52d Transportation Battalion

Activated 7 November 1955 at Fort Bragg, North Carolina

Converted and redesignated 22 December 1962 as Headquarters and Headquarters Company, 52d Aviation Battalion

Reorganized and redesignated 25 January 1965 as Headquarters and Headquarters Detachment, 52d Aviation Battalion

Reorganized and redesignated 25 November 1968 as Headquarters and Headquarters Company, 52d Aviation Battalion

Reorganized and redesignated 21 June 1979 as Headquarters and Headquarters Detachment, 52d Aviation Battalion

Reorganized and redesignated 16 October 1987 as Headquarters and Headquarters Company, 52d Aviation Battalion

Inactivated 16 October 1988 in Korea

Redesignated 16 January 1996 as the 52d Aviation, a parent regiment under the United States Army Regimental System

Redesignated 1 October 2005 as the 52d Aviation Regiment

Distinctive Unit Insignia
 Description
A gold color metal and enamel device  in height overall consisting of a pair of white wings pointing upward in the center of which, between the two leading edges, is a gold color sword also point up. Placed in the center of the sword blade is a red Florentine fleur-de-lis.
 Symbolism
The white wings represent the unit's capacity as an Aviation organization. The sword is a symbol of the Army and symbolizes the unit's combat power during World War II and the Korean War. The red fleur-de-lis of Florence alludes to World War II service in Italy.
 Background
The distinctive unit insignia was originally approved for the 52d Aviation Battalion on 22 June 1966. It was redesignated effective 16 September 1996, for the 52d Aviation Regiment.

Coat of Arms

Blazon
 Shield
Azure, a vol Argent surmounted by a sword Or, overall a Florentine fleur-de-lis Gules.
 Crest
From a wreath Argent and Azure two demi-spears with bamboo shafts saltirewise Proper between an arced branch of laurel and one of palm Or, overall a dragon passant Gules.
Motto FLYING DRAGONS.
 Symbolism
 Shield
Blue is the primary color for Aviation. The wings are symbolic of the unit's mission. The sword represents the unit's service in World War II and the Korean War. The red fleur-de-lis of Florence represents service in Italy during World War II.
 Crest
The dragon highlights the unit's motto and commemorates its campaign participation credits earned during World War II; red symbolizes courage and sacrifice. The bamboo spears commemorate Korean War and Vietnam service. The unit's decorations are symbolized by laurel for honor and high achievement and palm for victory.
 Background
The coat of arms was originally approved for the 52d Aviation Regiment on 7 February 1996. It was amended to include a crest on 16 April 1996.

Current configuration

 1st Battalion
 Alpha Company (Tomahawks) – Iraq Mar 2009 – Dec 2009
 Bravo Company (Sugar Bears) – Afghanistan Jun 2011 – Feb 2012
 Charlie Company (Arctic DUSTOFF) (UH-60) – Afghanistan Feb 2011 – Feb 2012
 Delta Company (Old Dukes)
 Echo Company (Eagle Support)
 Fox Company (Arctic Owls) – Afghanistan Mar 2014 – Nov 2014
 2nd Battalion (Constituted in the Regular Army 16 January 1996 as the 2nd Battalion, 52nd Aviation, and activated in the Republic of Korea)
 6th Battalion (Constituted in the Army Reserve on 16 October 1995 as the 6th Battalion (less Company A), 52nd Aviation, Activated (less Company A) on 16 September 1996 with its headquarters at JFTB Los Alamitos, California) (Flying Dragons)
 Headquarters and Headquarters Company JFTB Los Alamitos, California
 Alpha Company: C-12U and UC-35A Located at NAS Fort Worth JRB, TX
 Bravo Company: C-12V and UC-35A Located at JFTB Los Alamitos, CA
 Charlie Company: C-12V Located at Fort Knox, KY

See also
 List of United States Army aircraft battalions
 U.S. Army Regimental System
 United States Army Aviation Branch

References

External links
 http://www.history.army.mil/html/forcestruc/lineages/branches/av/default.htm
 https://web.archive.org/web/20110512225727/http://www.armyavnmuseum.org/index.html

052
Military units and formations established in 1940